Caledonian Brewery was a Scottish brewery founded in 1869 in the Shandon area of Edinburgh, Scotland.

History

Early years
When it was founded in 1869, the brewery was named the Lorimer and Clark Caledonian Brewery, after its founders George Lorimer and Robert Clark.

George Lorimer was just 18 years old when his father (George Lorimer Snr.) died in a fire at Edinburgh's Theatre Royal in 1865. Young George was a keen golfer and member of the Bruntsfield Links Golfing Society - which met at the Golf Tavern and played on the adjacent Bruntsfield Links.  It was through spending time at the Golf Tavern that George became friends with many of Edinburgh's leading brewers; including Thomas Aitchison, George Bernard and Robert Clark.

In 1868, George Lorimer came of age and inherited his father's estate. George was determined to use the money to start his own brewery. He enlisted the help of Robert Clark, then Head Brewer at the Alexander Melvin Brewery in Edinburgh and together they opened Lorimer and Clark's Caledonian Brewery on the Slateford Road site. In 1892, to designs by the architect Robert Hamilton Paterson, buildings on the site were re-constructed and new brewery and maltings buildings erected.

Although the brewery sold its beers and a number of stouts all over Scotland, its most popular beer was Lorimer's Best Scotch, which was sold predominantly in the north-east of England.

Vaux era
On George Lorimer's death in 1939, The Caledonian Brewery passed into the hands of Sunderland-based Vaux Breweries, who developed Lorimer’s Best Scotch brand into one of the most popular beers in the North East of England. In 1986 they decided to cease brewing in Edinburgh and transfer the operation to their base in Sunderland.

Eventually neglect and lack of investment took their toll and placed the brewery under threat of closure. In 1987, the brewery was saved through a management buy-out led by head brewer, Russell Sharp.

Scottish & Newcastle era
In 2004, the brewery site and production facilities were bought by Scottish & Newcastle (S&N), following their closure of the McEwan's Brewery in Fountainbridge, Edinburgh. Production of McEwan's ales has been transferred to the Caledonian Brewery.

At the same time, a new Caledonian Brewing Company (CBC) was formed by several former shareholders and directors of the pre-2004 business. CBC owns the Caledonian brands and operates the brewery site on behalf of the owners. Whilst S&N has taken a 30% share in this business, CBC operates on an independent basis.

In January 2006, the Caledonian Brewing Company purchased the Harviestoun Brewery based in Alva, makers of Bitter and Twisted.

In 2008, S&N bought the remaining shares in CBC to take full control of the company. The brands remain unaffected and brewing will continue at the site. Harviestoun was not part of the takeover and was retained by Caledonian's shareholders to run as a separate concern. With the takeover of S&N, Heineken now control the Caledonian Brewery Company.

Heineken era
In 2008, Heineken acquired the UK assets of Scottish and Newcastle which included the Caledonian Brewery.
In May 2022, Heineken announced the proposed closure of the Caledonian Brewery with an agreement in principle for Belhaven Brewery to brew its Scottish brands.

In October, JLL was appointed to market the site. It advised the complex had potential for redevelopment into flats, a hotel, or student accommodation.

Beers

Caledonian's most well known beers are Deuchars IPA and 80/- (Now rebadged as Edinburgh Castle). They also brew Flying Scotsman, four seasonal beers and several monthly guest ales.

References

External links 

 Caledonian Brewery
 Caledonian Scottish Brewing.com history

Breweries in Scotland
Buildings and structures in Edinburgh
Manufacturing companies based in Edinburgh
British companies established in 1869
1869 establishments in Scotland
Food and drink companies established in 1869
Companies based in Edinburgh